Alessandro Troncon (born 6 September 1973 in Treviso) is a former Italian rugby union player.

Troncon is the 6th most capped player in Italian rugby union history, and the first Italian to gain 100 caps. The veteran scrum-half made his Italy debut against Spain (62–15) in 1994 and has played alongside fly-half Diego Dominguez on more than 50 occasions. He suffered a serious knee injury after the 2003 World Cup which forced him to miss the entire 2004 Six Nations, and to lose the captaincy for his national team.

Troncon spent two years at French side Montferrand before returning to Treviso.

In 2007 Troncon was named man of the match as he scored a try in Italy's first overseas victory at Murrayfield against Scotland (37–17) in the 2007 Six Nations. Also he was named Man of the Match in the defeat to England (7–20) at Twickenham in the 2007 Six Nations. Troncon was in the Italian squad at the 2007 World Cup, during which he made his 100th appearance for his country, in a pool-match game against  (31–5). In doing this, he became only the seventh rugby player to reach 100 caps, after George Gregan, Stephen Larkham, David Campese, Jason Leonard, Fabien Pelous, Philippe Sella and one game before Gareth Thomas. He announced he was leaving competition after the tournament.

He became assistant coach to Italy head coach Nick Mallett in 2008. From 2022 Troncon is Assistant Coach for Benetton Rugby.

See also
List of rugby union Test caps leaders

References

External links
RBS 6 Nations profile

1973 births
Italian rugby union players
Sportspeople from Treviso
Living people
Benetton Rugby players
ASM Clermont Auvergne players
Rugby union scrum-halves
Italy international rugby union players